Abdul Qayum (b. 1 March 1960) is a British Bangladeshi scholar and the chief Imam of the East London Mosque. A former lecturer of the International Islamic University Malaysia, Abdul Qayum served also as a presenter on Islamic programmes on Peace TV Bangla and Channel 9.

Background
Abdul Qayum was born in the District of Noakhali in East Pakistan (now Bangladesh). He studied Islamic Sciences and Hadith at the Government Madrasah-e-Alia in Dhaka and then continued his studies of Islamic Sciences under several scholars in Riyadh, Saudi Arabia. At the Imam Muhammad ibn Saud Islamic University, he completed a Bachelor of Arts in Arabic Language & Literature and a Master of Arts in Applied linguistics. He then became a lecturer of Quranic Arabic at the International Islamic University of Malaysia.

After moving to the United Kingdom with his family, he was elected as the Khatib of the East London Mosque in 1993. In 2008, he was made aware of Richard House Children's Hospice and in 2010 he became a patron. He is a member of European Council for Fatwa and Research and National Council of Imams and Rabbis, which is a registered operating name of the Joseph Interfaith Foundation. He is also a signatory to Istanbul's Environmental Declaration.

Abdul Qayum studied hadith and other Islamic sciences alongside Mohammad Akram Nadwi and attended SOAS, University of London.

In early January 2021, he and some of his family members had tested positive for COVID-19 amid the pandemic, and were admitted to the Royal London Hospital for care.

Current employment 
 Imam and Khateeb of the East London Mosque

References

External links 
 
 Establish Justice (English)
 Death (English)
 Preparing for Ramadan (English)
 Death (Arabic)
 3 deeds Allah loves (Bengali)

Imams
1960 births
Living people
Bangladeshi Muslims
Bangladeshi emigrants to the United Kingdom
People from Noakhali District
British imams
British Muslims
British Sunni Muslims
Imam Muhammad ibn Saud Islamic University alumni
Academic staff of the International Islamic University Malaysia
Government Madrasah-e-Alia alumni
21st-century Bengalis
20th-century Bengalis
Islamic scholars in the United Kingdom
Bengali Muslim scholars of Islam